Joachim-Friedrich is a German masculine given name, and may refer to:

 Joachim Frederick, Elector of Brandenburg (1564-1608), German elector
 Joachim-Friedrich Huth (1896–1962), German soldier
 Joachim-Friedrich Lang (1899–1945), German general

See also
 Joachim Frederick, Elector of Brandenburg

German masculine given names